All-Russian Congress of Soviets of Workers' and Soldiers' Deputies may refer to:
 All-Russian Central Executive Committee of the Soviets of Workers' and Soldiers' Deputies
 First All-Russian Congress of Soviets of Workers' and Soldiers' Deputies
 Second All-Russian Congress of Soviets of Workers' and Soldiers' Deputies
 Third All-Russian Congress of Workers', Soldiers' and Peasants Deputies' Soviets